Church of the Ascension Greek Catholic Parish Church (UGCC) in Chortkiv of the Chortkiv urban hromada of the Chortkiv Raion of the Ternopil Oblast.

History 
The parish was founded in 1717. The church was built in 1630. During the attack on Chortkiv by Turks and Tatars in 1640 and 1672, the church was horribly destroyed. The church was finally rebuilt in 1717. Until then, it had the title of St. Nicholas. Worship services were resumed in June 1717. The parish became Greek Catholic.

The construction of the Church of the Ascension was carried out with the direct participation and at the expense of the residents of Dolishna Vygnanka, as well as with the assistance of the church fraternity of Chortkiv and craftsmen.

From the beginning to the middle of the XX century. The Church of the Ascension did not function, it was in an abandoned state. In July 1967, the architect V. Zakharov developed a project for the restoration of the church, after which the Church of the Ascension was transferred to state protection as a monument of wooden architecture of Ukraine in the XVIII century.

After 1946, the Greek Catholics of the former parish continued to worship underground. The first service after the resumption of activities took place in a suburban cemetery in Sinyakovo, where a chapel was installed for Easter 1989.

In 2003-2014, Fr. Andriy Melnyk managed to join the community of new parishioners, to carry out large-scale repair and restoration work on the church.

On May 28, 2017, the Divine Liturgy on the occasion of the 300th anniversary of the church was presided over by Metropolitan Vasyl Semeniuk and Eparch Dmytro Hryhorak.

At the parish there are: the Brotherhood "Apostolate of Prayer", the community "Mothers in Prayer", "Ukrainian Youth of Christ", the Bible Circle, the Society "Mercy". The parish owns the estate.

Abbots 
 at. Petro Dudinskyi (1890-1905)
 at. Yakiv Tymchuk
 at. Didych
 at. Joseph Bilan
 at. Mykhailo Korzhynskyi
 at. Taras Senkiv
 at. Hryhoryi Kanak
 at. Roman Honcharyk (1994-2003)
 at. Andriy Melnyk (since 2003)
 at. Volodymyr Bylynchuk (2009-2013)
 at. Marian Lemchuk (since 2013)

References

Sources 
 м. Чортків. Церква Вознесіння Господнього (Чортків). W: Бучацька єпархія УГКЦ. Парафії, монастирі, храми. Шематизм / Автор концепції Б. Куневич; керівник проєкту, науковий редактор Я. Стоцький, Тернопіль: ТОВ «Новий колір», 2014, s. 358.: іл., ISBN 978-966-2061-30-7. (ukr.)

Churches in Chortkiv